Interstate 74 (I-74) in the US state of Ohio runs for  southeast from the Indiana border to the western segment's current eastern terminus at I-75 just north of Downtown Cincinnati. It is also signed with U.S. Route 52 (US 52) for its entire length.

Route description
The Ohio portion of I-74 begins on the Indiana border near Harrison and travels east. Shortly after crossing into Ohio, the Interstate curves southeast before it intersects with I-275 near milepost 5. It then overlaps with that beltway route, heading generally east for approximately  before splitting from I-275 to continue southeast into Cincinnati.

History

Future
Proposals call for I-74 to be continued through Ohio and into West Virginia, concurrent with I-73; with both of these roads continuing through Virginia and North Carolina to end in Myrtle Beach, South Carolina. Due to funding concerns, there are no concrete plans for this to occur.

However, several plans are in the running for the extension through the Cincinnati metropolitan area. They include:
Running along I-75 and I-275, then onto State Route 32 (SR 32);
Along I-75 between the I-74/I-75 interchange and I-75/SR 562 interchange, then onto SR 562, I-71 between SR 562 and Red Bank corridor, down the Red Bank corridor, and along a new highway connector to SR 32; and
From the I-74/I-75 interchange to I-75/SR 562 interchange, then onto SR 562, then along I-71 and I-275 before connecting to SR 32.
The second route was eliminated due to opposition regarding a key part of its completion: a $366.2-million highway that would need to be constructed near Mariemont and Newtown (terminuses: Red Bank Road/Wooster Pike intersection and Bells Lane). Total costs would have been $809.1 million ($62 million per mile (/km)). Improvements to existing roads have been proposed instead. 

The Norwood Lateral (SR 562) would need to be reconstructed in order to become part of I-74. It needs the following: a third travel lane in each direction (two each currently), overpasses that would need more vertical clearance ( minimum), upgraded ramp extensions at interchanges, and shoulders that might need more width. This problem could be resolved through Congress if they wanted to designate the Norwood Lateral as a future segment of the Interstate Highway System.

Exit list

References

 Ohio
74
Roads in Cincinnati
Transportation in Hamilton County, Ohio